Aabey, also spelled Abey, is a village located in Mount Lebanon, in Aley District of Mount Lebanon Governorate. It is bordered by Kfarmatta (South), Al Bennay (East), Damour (West), and Ain Ksour (North).
It overlooks Damour and the capital Beirut and the sea can be seen from virtually any point in the village. Aabey contains the Dawdye college, Aabey Vocational School (Mihanye) etc.

History 
The name Aabey comes from the Aramaic word meaning “abundant.” The village has a remarkable history. It was during the Fatimid then the Mamlouk periods that the Tanukh tribes came from north Arabia in the eighth century and settled in Abey due to its strategic position, in order to protect the coast against the Byzantine invasions.

Aabey is a very old village famed in the past as a Druze religious center. Aabey is full of remains associated with the Tannoukh Emirs (Buhturids), descendants of an Arab tribe settled in this region by the Abbasids around the mid-8th century.

The Tanoukh princes were cavalry officers in a special regiment of the Mamluk army led by Sultan al-Ashraf Khalil which conquered Beirut in 1291. They settled in the town, with members later occasionally being appointed Governors, sometimes with their remit extending to Sidon. One branch of the clan established their summer residence in Aabey, where the remains of several of their buildings can still be seen.

The Amir Mounther Mosque is a testimony of their glory in Beirut.

The Tanoukh princes encouraged advances in history, astronomy, language, medicine and poetry. Art and crafts, wood and stone carving, as well as calligraphy, flourished during the second part of the 15th century. Aabey had become a cultural hub.

During this period Aabey was the residence of Sayid Abdallah at-Tannukhi who is credited with uniting the Druze communities in the Chouf mountain range.

The rivalry among the princes in the mountain put an end to the Tanoukhs, who were followed by the Maans. Later on the Chehab princes took over, before Aabey became the administrative seat for the Ottoman ruler.

Among the monuments left by this feudal dynasty are the fountain of the Emirs, the residence of Emir Qa'an At-Tannoukhi (17th-18th centuries), the residence of Sheikh Riad Amine Eddine and the restored Druze tomb (Maqam (shrine)) of Sayid Abdallah at-Tannukhi (died 1487), which is an important Druze pilgrimage site.

Other monuments are the churches of as-Saydeh, Mar Sarkis and Bakhos, Mar Maroun, and the Evangelical church founded by European missionaries in the 17th century.

During the early 19th century American Protestant missionaries began arriving in Beirut. The Druze communities, unlike their Maronite and Greek Orthodox contemporaries, welcomed the establishment of schools in their villages.

In 1838, Eli Smith noted  the place, called 'Abeih , located in  El-Ghurb el-Fokany, upper el-Ghurb. In 1839 the missionaries established a medical centre in Aabey, and in 1843 W.M. Thomson and Cornelius Van Alen Van Dyck came to live in the village and set up a boys seminary. In his The Land and the Book Thomson gives a vivid account of the village being overrun by an invasion of locusts which lasted four days.

A great number of famous personalities such as scholars, doctors, educators and journalists came from Aabey, including the Greek Orthodox Archbishop Gregoire Haddad, as well as the famous surgeons Dr. Sami I. Haddad, Dr. Farid S. Haddad and Dr. Fuad S. Haddad who founded and worked in the Orient Hospital.

Aabey is the seat of the house of Abu Nakad (ال نكد Al Nakadi later) the Druze feudal family in  Mount Lebanon along with Junblatt, Al Imad, Talhouk and Abdul Malak. Ιn 1845 part of the Nakadi family, namely sheikh Qassim beik Al Nakadi and his brothers sheikh Salim beik Al Nakadi and sheikh Said beik Al Nakadi moved to Aabey from Deir Al Qamar.

Aabey is the birthplace of Fuad Hamza who served as the personal adviser of King Abdulaziz, the founder of Saudi Arabia. He was granted Saudi nationality and was appointed as a Saudi ambassador to France and the United States, as well as Saudi deputy minister for foreign affairs. One of his famous books is "Al-Bilad Al-Arabia Al-Saudia".

Presbyterian missionary Layyah Barakat was born in Aabey, and returned in 1922 to open an orphanage for girls there.

Families of Aabey 

The main families in Aabey are: Hamza, Halabi, Haddad, Hassan, Abdel Wili, Amaneldine, Ataya, Faraj, Jamal, Jaber, Nakadi, Nasr, Kuntar, Ghrayeb, Khoury, Kanaan, Raydan, Shreety, Timani and Wehbe.

References

Bibliography

External links 
Aabey – Ain Drafil, Localiban
Aabey Municipality Official Blog
Aabey Facebook Page
 Aabey Heritage Association
History of Aabey

Populated places in Aley District